Zachepylivka is an urban-type settlement in Krasnohrad Raion, Kharkiv Oblast, Ukraine. It hosts the administration of Zachepylivka settlement hromada, one of the hromadas of Ukraine. Population: 

Zachepilovka is located on the left bank of the Berestova river, close to its mouth. The Berestova is a right tributary of the Oril, a major left tributary of the Dnieper.

History 
It was a village in Konstantinograd uyezd of Poltava Governorate of the Russian Empire.

A local newspaper is published here since 1933.

Urban-type settlement since 1968.

In January 1989 the population was 5130 people. In January 2013 the population was 3753 people.

Until 18 July 2020, Zachepylivka was the administrative center of Zachepylivka Raion. The raion was abolished in July 2020 as part of the administrative reform of Ukraine, which reduced the number of raions of Kharkiv Oblast to seven. The area of Zachepylivka Raion was merged into Krasnohrad Raion.

Economy

Transportation
Zachepylivka has access to the Highway M29 which connects Kharkiv and Dnipro. There are local roads as well.

Zachepivka railway station is located not in Zachepylivka but in the settlement of Nahirne, across the river west of Zachepylivka. It has train connections to Krasnohrad and Dnipro.

References

Urban-type settlements in Krasnohrad Raion